A biological specimen (also called a biospecimen) is a biological laboratory specimen held by a biorepository for research. Such a specimen would be taken by sampling so as to be representative of any other specimen taken from the source of the specimen. When biological specimens are stored, ideally they remain equivalent to freshly-collected specimens for the purposes of research.

Human biological specimens are stored in a type of biorepository called a biobank, and the science of preserving biological specimens is most active in the field of biobanking.

Quality control
Setting broad standards for quality of biological specimens was initially an underdeveloped aspect of biobank growth. There is currently discussion on what standards should be in place and who should manage those standards. Since many organizations set their own standards and since biobanks are necessarily used by multiple organizations and typically are driven towards expansion, the harmonization of standard operating procedures for lab practices are a high priority. The procedures have to be evidence-based and will change with time as new research and technology becomes available.

Policy makers
Some progress for the creation of policy-making organizations include the National Cancer Institute's 2005 creation of the Office of Biobanking and Biospecimen Research (OBBR) and the annual Biospecimen Research Network Symposia. The International Society for Biological and Environmental Repositories, International Agency for Research on Cancer, Organisation for Economic Co-operation and Development, and the Australasian Biospecimen Network have also proposed policies and standards. In 2008 AFNOR, a French standardization organization, published the first biobank-specific quality standard. Aspects of ISO 9000 have been applied to biobanks.

Quality goals
Quality criteria for specimens depends on the study being considered and there is not a universal standard specimen type. DNA integrity is an important factor for studies which involve whole genome amplification. RNA integrity is critical for some studies and can be assessed by gel electrophoresis. Also biobanks, which do specimen storage, cannot take full responsibility for specimen integrity, because before they take custody of samples someone must collect and process them and effects such as RNA degradation are more likely to occur from delayed sample processing than inadequate storage.

Samples stored

Biorepositories store various types of specimens.  Different specimens are useful for different purposes.

Storage techniques
Many specimens in biobanks are cryopreserved.  Other specimens are stored in other ways.

Techniques associated with biobanks
Some of the laboratory techniques associated with biological specimen storage include phenol-chloroform extraction, PCR, and RFLP.

References

External links
Biospecimen research database, a curated collection of articles about biospecimens
Office of Biorepositories and Biospecimen Research
Specimen Central biorepository list, A worldwide listing of active biobanks and biorepositories
Biospecimen Research Network Symposia, a conference on biobank specimens
Mayo Clinic on biobanking
Short Public TV episode on museum Collections 
Biospecimen Collection Services

Biobanks